Cone Health is a private, not-for-profit healthcare delivery system based in Greensboro, North Carolina. It includes Moses H. Cone Memorial Hospital, Wesley Long Hospital, Women's Hospital, and Cone Health Behavioral Health Hospital, all located in Greensboro. The Cone Health network also includes Alamance Regional Medical Center (Burlington, North Carolina), Annie Penn Hospital (Reidsville, North Carolina), MedCenter High Point, MedCenter Kernersville, MedCenter Mebane, and a wide range of Cone Health Medical Group physician practices.

The Moses H. Cone Memorial Hospital, the flagship of the system, opened in 1953 on  near downtown Greensboro. Bertha Cone established it in honor of her husband, Moses H. Cone. Moses Cone was a textile magnate and founder of Cone Mills.

Cone Health is active in cardiology, neuroscience, oncology, rehabilitation and obstetrics. In January 2005, the health system became the first five-hospital system in the Southeast to be awarded the Magnet Recognition for Nursing Excellence, a grade of approval for quality nursing care.

In 2014, Cone Health, listed as The Moses H. Cone Memorial Hospital, was ranked as one of the best hospitals in North Carolina for 2014–15 by U.S. News & World Report.

In August 2020, Cone Health announced its intent to merge with Sentara Healthcare, though the planned consolidation was later canceled in 2021.

References

External links
 

 
Hospital networks in the United States
Healthcare in Greensboro, North Carolina
Cone family